Havilan (also Romanized as Ḩāvīlān; also known as Hāvīlā) is a village in Zhan Rural District, in the Central District of Dorud County, Lorestan Province, Iran. At the 2006 census, its population was 63, in 12 families.

References 

Towns and villages in Dorud County